Babadıl Islands (a.k.a. Beşparmak Islands) are two small Mediterranean islands in Turkey. They are named after the former name of the village Sipahili in the mainland facing the islands. According to the British captain Francis Beaufort who was tasked to map the Mediterranean coasts of Turkey in 1811–12, the names of the islands were Papadoulae, in the antiquity. Modern scholarship identifies the island group with Akonesiai, and the northern island with ancient Crambusa or Krambousa (Κράμβουσα).

They are in the eastern end of a bay and are observable from the Turkish state highway  which runs mostly along the sea side. Both islands are uninhabited. But there are remains of a castle and some vaulted tombs from the Medieval Age.

References

Islands of Turkey
Islands of Mersin Province
Mediterranean islands
Gülnar District